The 1940 Hardin–Simmons Cowboys football team represented Hardin–Simmons University as an independent during the 1940 college football season. In its sixth and final season under head coach Frank Kimbrough, the team compiled a perfect 9–0 record, outscored opponents by a total of 235 to 76, and was ranked No. 17 in the final AP Poll. In January 1941, Coach Kimbrough left Hardin–Simmons to become head football coach at Baylor University. Kimbrough compiled a 47–8–3 in six seasons at Hardin-Simmons.

Schedule

References

Hardin-Simmons
Hardin–Simmons Cowboys football seasons
College football undefeated seasons
Hardin-Simmons Cowboys football